Pajubá is a Brazilian cryptolect which inserts numerous words and expressions from West African languages into the Portuguese language. It is spoken by practitioners of Afro-Brazilian religions, such as Candomblé and Umbanda, and by the Brazilian LGBT community. Its source languages include Umbundu, Kimbundo, Kikongo, Egbá, Ewe, Fon and Yoruba. It also includes words borrowed from Spanish, French, and English, as well as words of Portuguese origin with altered meanings.

It is also often described as "the speaking in the language of the saints" or "rolling the tongue", much used by the "saint people" (priests of African religions) when one wants to say something so that other people cannot understand.

In the travesti (Brazilian transvestite) community, Pajubá is usually accompanied by exaggeratedly "queer" body language, part of an aesthetic called fexação (lit. "closing", roughly analogous to "flaming" in English) intended to subvert societal expectations to conceal or downplay one's LGBT identity.

Etymology
In both the candomblé and the LGBT community, the word pajubá or bajubá means "gossip", "news", or "update", referring to other related groups or events occurring (both good things and bad things) in those circles.

History
Pajubá began to be used by the LGBT community during the period of the military government of Brazil (1964–85) as a means of facing police repression and mislead what people could gather from what they heard. The argot was created spontaneously in regions with the strongest African presence in Brazil, such as Umbanda and Candomblé "terreiros" (religious locations), and the dialect contains many Africanisms. The dialect was later adopted as a code between travestis and later between all LGBT communities and sympathizers. 

In November 2018, a question mentioning Pajubá was included in the National High School Exam.

References

Cant languages
LGBT culture in Brazil
LGBT linguistics
Afro-Brazilian culture